In late 1977, the new World Series Cricket competition began in Australia between three teams playing both multi-day and one day games. The first set of these fixtures to be played was a three match series between the Australian team and the West Indies team, starting at the beginning of December.

Background
Since 1976, Kerry Packer, the owner of the Nine Network, had sought the rights to broadcast live coverage of Australia's home test matches, and had found himself rebuffed by the Australian Cricket Board in favour of continued live coverage on the Australian Broadcasting Company, which was the country's state broadcaster. Following Nine's winning of the rights to broadcast the 1977 Ashes tour to England, in which Packer was presented with the idea of staging some televised exhibition matches,
he fleshed it out into the idea of a full blown series of games between the best Australian players, and the best players from the rest of the world. In 1977, Packer began signing contracts with Australian players recommended by former Australia captain Ian Chappell, while he was also able to negotiate a deal with then England captain Tony Greig for him to act as Packer's agent in signing non-Australian players. Among these non-Australians were a significant number of players from the West Indies, who found the contracts they were being offered would pay them potentially more than they could earn in their entire careers. As a consequence, although only intended to feature Australia against the Rest of the World, the organisers were able to form a third team, made up wholly of West Indian players.

The first match was scheduled as a five-day game between the Australian XI and the West Indies XI from 2 December 1977; Packer was unable to use the term "Test Match", so the fixture was the first of what came to be known as "Supertests". This game, held at VFL Park in Melbourne, began on the same day as the first day of the official Australian team's Test Match against India in Brisbane.

Supertests
Owing to the fact that the MCC holds the copyright to the Laws of Cricket, and Packer was therefore prevented from using them, he recruited former Australia captain Richie Benaud to formulate the rules and conditions for the new competition, which led to each over consisting of 8 balls.

First Supertest

Second Supertest

Third Supertest

References

Haigh, Gideon (1993): The Cricket War – the Inside Story of Kerry Packer's World Series Cricket, Text Publishing. .
Lillee, Dennis (2003): Menace: The Autobiography, Headline. .

1977 in Australian cricket
1977 in West Indian cricket
1977–78 Australian cricket season
1978 in Australian cricket
1978 in West Indian cricket
International cricket competitions from 1975–76 to 1980
West Indian cricket tours of Australia
World Series Cricket